Elienor Werner (born 5 May 1998) is a Swedish female Pole vaulter, who won an individual gold medal at the Youth World Championships.

References

External links

1998 births
Living people
Swedish female pole vaulters